Transfiguration is a c. 1515–1516 tempera on panel painting by Pordenone, now in the Pinacoteca di Brera in Milan.

It originally formed the central panel of a triptych for San Salvatore church in Collalto near Treviso. Each side panel showed a pair of saints - Saint Prosdocimus and Saint Peter (North Carolina Museum of Art) and Saint John the Baptist and Saint Jerome (now lost). Its colouring prefigures that of Giorgione

References

Paintings in the collection of the Pinacoteca di Brera
Pordenone
1516 paintings
Paintings of James the Great
Paintings depicting Saint Peter
Paintings depicting John the Apostle